"Revhead" may refer to:

 car enthusiast (term used in Australia)
 A fan of the rock group, The Revivalists (New Orleans)
 "hoon" or "boy racer" (term used in Australia)
 Revhead (Home and Away), fictional character in Australian soap opera Home and Away
 You're a Revhead, a 2011 compilation by Australian musician Adam Brand.